Liu Dan (born April 24, 1987, in Shenyang, Liaoning) is a female Chinese basketball player who was part of the team that won the gold medal at the 2005 Asian Championship. She competed at the 2008 Summer Olympics in Beijing.

References

1987 births
Living people
Basketball players at the 2008 Summer Olympics
Olympic basketball players of China
Basketball players from Shenyang
Chinese women's basketball players
Asian Games medalists in basketball
Basketball players at the 2006 Asian Games
Basketball players at the 2010 Asian Games
Basketball players at the 2014 Asian Games
Asian Games gold medalists for China
Asian Games silver medalists for China
Medalists at the 2006 Asian Games
Medalists at the 2010 Asian Games
Medalists at the 2014 Asian Games
Shenyang Army Golden Lions players